Karl Gottfried Hagen (24 December 1749 – 2 March 1829) was a German chemist.

Hagen was born and died in Königsberg, Prussia.

He founded the first German chemical laboratory at the University of Königsberg, thus establishing the scientific discipline of pharmaceutical chemistry in Germany. He worked as a professor in the field of physics, chemistry and mineralogy.

His daughter, Johanna, married the astronomer Friedrich Wilhelm Bessel.

Another daughter, Louise Florentine, married the physicist Franz Ernst Neumann.

Works
 Lehrbuch der Apothekerkunst . Hartung, Königsberg; Leipzig 2nd ed. 1781 Digital edition / Dritte, rechtmäßige und verbesserte Ausgabe 1786 Digital edition / 1788 Digital edition /Vol.1 6th ed. 1806 Digital edition / Vol.1&2 7th ed. 1808 Digital edition / Vol.2 1821 Digital edition by the University and State Library Düsseldorf
 Grundriß der Experimentalpharmacie zum Gebrauch bey dem Vortrage derselben . Hartung, Königsberg / Leipzig 1790 Digital edition by the University and State Library Düsseldorf

References

External links
  Biography
  Another biography (German)

1749 births
1829 deaths
18th-century German chemists
Scientists from Königsberg
Academic staff of the University of Königsberg
19th-century German chemists